Gilles Bocq (born 23 January 1950) is a French former professional footballer who played as a defender. He made twelve Division 1 appearances for Rouen in the 1977–78 season.

References 

1950 births

Living people
Footballers from Paris
French footballers
Association football defenders
USM Malakoff (football) players
FC Rouen players
French Division 3 (1971–1993) players
Ligue 2 players
Ligue 1 players